Martin Linton Smith,  (4 July 1869 – 7 October 1950) was an Anglican bishop who served in three dioceses during the first half of the twentieth century.

Life
Smith was born into a clerical family – his father was the Very Revd James Allan Smith, Dean of St David's Cathedral from 1904 until his death in 1918 He died in post during November 1918.– and educated at Repton and Hertford College, Oxford. Ordained priest in 1894 he was a curate at four parishes before securing his own incumbency at Colchester in 1902. By now married to Kathleen Dewe with a young family, he gained experience in Liverpool eventually becoming a Cathedral Canon. His finest hour, however, was the First World War where he gained the DSO for his sterling work at The Somme, Arras and Ypres. He had been appointed a Temporary Chaplain to the Forces in April, 1915, serving at first in Prescott before being posted abroad.  He was also Mentioned in Despatches. 

When peace came he was raised to the episcopate, firstly for two years as the suffragan Bishop of Warrington; then translated to the more senior post of diocesan Bishop of Hereford in 1920, serving there for a decade; and, finally, a further nine years as Bishop of Rochester. Retiring to Cheltenham in 1940 he died after a long life "rich in service".

Notes

Works

Lambeth and Reunion: An Interpretation of the Mind of the Lambeth Conference of 1920, with Frank Theodore Woods and Martin Linton Smith (London: Society for Promoting Christian Knowledge, 1921).

Book cited

1869 births

1950 deaths
People educated at Repton School

Alumni of Hertford College, Oxford
Bishops of Warrington
Bishops of Hereford
Bishops of Rochester
Companions of the Distinguished Service Order
20th-century Church of England bishops